Michael York (born 1942) is an English actor 

Michael York may also refer to:
 Michael York (religious studies scholar), American religious studies scholar
 Michael York (field hockey) (born 1967), Australian former field hockey defender
 Michael M. York (born 1953), American journalist and attorney
 Mike York (born 1978), ice hockey player
 Mike York (baseball) (born 1964), former MLB pitcher

See also
 Michael Yorke (1939–2019), Anglican priest